Justice White can refer to:

United States Supreme Court
Byron Raymond White (1917 - 2002), associate justice of the United States Supreme Court
Edward Douglass White (1845 - 1921), chief justice of the United States Supreme Court

United States state supreme courts
Alexander White (Alabama politician), associate justice of the Territorial Utah Supreme Court
C. Thomas White, associate justice of the Nebraska Supreme Court
Hugh Lawson White, associate justice of the Tennessee Supreme Court
John D. White (judge), associate justice of the Kentucky Supreme Court
John Turner White, associate justice of the Supreme Court of Missouri
John White (Alabama judge), associate justice of the Alabama Supreme Court
Paul W. White, associate justice of the Nebraska Supreme Court
Penny J. White, associate justice of the Tennessee Supreme Court
Ronnie L. White, associate justice and chief justice of the Supreme Court of Missouri
S. Harrison White, associate justice and chief justice of the Colorado Supreme Court
Thomas P. White, associate justice of the Supreme Court of California
Weldon B. White, associate justice of the Tennessee Supreme Court
William White (judge), associate justice of the Supreme Court of Ohio

Australian courts
Richard Weeks White, justice of the Supreme Court of New South Wales
Richard Conway White, judge of the Federal Court of Australia

See also
Robert Whyte (judge), associate justice of the Tennessee Supreme Court